The Palestinian Communist Party may refer to:

Socialist Workers Party (Mandatory Palestine) of 1919 which was a precursor to
Palestinian Communist Party (1922)
Communist Party of Palestine, which existed from 1922 to 1923
Palestine Communist Party, formed in 1923 by the merger of the first two parties
Palestinian Communist Party founded in 1982 and now known as the Palestinian People's Party
Palestinian Communist Party (1990s), a hardline faction which split from the Palestinian People's Party
Revolutionary Palestinian Communist Party, a hardline faction that split in 1982. They are based in Syria and are a founding member of the Alliance of Palestinian Forces

See also
 Palestinian Communist Workers Party